Progress M-22 was a Russian unmanned Progress cargo spacecraft, which was launched in March 1994 to resupply the Mir space station.

Launch
Progress M-22 launched on 22 March 1994 from the Baikonur Cosmodrome in Kazakhstan. It used a Soyuz-U rocket.

Docking
Progress M-22 docked with the aft port of the Kvant-1 module of Mir on 24 March 1994 at 06:39:37 UTC, and was undocked on 23 May 1994 at 00:58:38 UTC.

Decay
It remained in orbit until 23 May 1994, when it was deorbited. The mission ended at 04:40 UTC.

See also

 1994 in spaceflight
 List of Progress missions
 List of uncrewed spaceflights to Mir

References

Progress (spacecraft) missions
1994 in Kazakhstan
Spacecraft launched in 1994
Spacecraft which reentered in 1994
Spacecraft launched by Soyuz-U rockets